A. Pauliah was an Indian politician and former Member of the Legislative Assembly. He was elected to the Tamil Nadu legislative assembly as an Indian National Congress (Organisation) candidate from Colachel constituency in 1971 election and as an Indian National Congress candidate in 1989 and 1991 elections.

References 

People from Kanyakumari district
Indian National Congress politicians from Tamil Nadu
Living people
Year of birth missing (living people)
Tamil Nadu MLAs 1991–1996
Indian National Congress (Organisation) politicians